Alberto Bernardo de Azevedo Leite Rodrigues (born 15 September 1945) is a Portuguese equestrian. He competed in two events at the 1992 Summer Olympics.

References

External links
 

1945 births
Living people
Portuguese male equestrians
Olympic equestrians of Portugal
Equestrians at the 1992 Summer Olympics
People from Aveiro, Portugal
Sportspeople from Aveiro District